The 2016–17 Sunfoil 3-Day Cup was a first-class cricket competition that took place in South Africa from 6 October 2016 to 9 April 2017. The competition was played between the thirteen South African provincial teams and Namibia. Unlike its counterpart, the Sunfoil Series, the matches were three days in length instead of four. The tournament was played in parallel with the 2016–17 CSA Provincial One-Day Challenge, a List A competition which featured the same teams.

Northerns finished top of Pool A and Free State finished top of Pool B, with both teams progressing to the final of the competition. The final ended as a draw, with both teams sharing the title.

Points table

Pool A

 Team qualified for the final

Pool B

 Team qualified for the final

Group stage

Pool A

Pool B

Cross Pool

Final

References

External links
 Series home at ESPN Cricinfo

South African domestic cricket competitions
Sunfoil 3-Day Cup
2016–17 South African cricket season
Sunfoil Series